Lahannya is an English singer, songwriter and performer. Since 2005 she has been the vocalist and front woman of her own band with Lutz Demmler as co-songwriter, producer and bass player. Lahannya and Lutz are complemented live by Christopher Milden and Luca Mazzucconi.

Lahannya is well known in the dark alternative scene for her collaborations with Soman, Greenhaus, Xotox and Dracul with whom she performed many gigs and festivals including M'Era Luna and Wave-Gotik-Treffen.  In the early 2000s Lahannya occasionally DJed at the London alternative club Slimelight.

History

Early days
Lahannya's first release came by complete chance after the US underground label, Zenflesh, came across a demo of her first track, "Drowning". They persuaded her to go ahead and record a full version of it for their forthcoming compilation album, Amduscias. Despite being completely on her own, and having no supporting band, she went ahead and was pleasantly surprised at the positive feedback she received as a result. The feedback inspired her to write an EP, which was to form the basis for the band seen today.

Formation of the band
After many collaborations with numerous acts, such as Greenhaus and Soman, Lahannya came into contact with Umbra Et Imago bassist Lutz Demmler at the M'Era Luna Festival in 2004. This quickly developed into a friendship and collaboration. A couple of brief line-up changes, towards the end of 2006 the duo came into contact with ex Killing Miranda drummer Belle, and NFD guitarist Chris Milden.

Shotgun Reality
The band now set about writing and recording their debut album, Shotgun Reality. Upon completion they secured support slots with Emilie Autumn and Moon Kana.

Welcome to the Underground
After the success of Shotgun Reality, Lahannya worked on a concept EP as the build up to the band's second album. Upon completion of the EP, Lahannya supported German goth rock band ASP on a three-week Germany tour. ASP also contributed a remix of the track "Inside the Machine" to the Welcome to the Underground EP. Two UK tours followed, which were very successful with audiences continually growing, but the undisputed highlight was Lahannya's performance at the open air amphitheatre Parkbuehne as part of the four day Wave Gotik Treffen music festival, in Leipzig, Germany.

Defiance
The band then released their second album, Defiance, on 19 October 2009.

Scavenger
Scavenger was released in November 2010 - a stop gap release mixing two new songs and a live DVD from the MFVF 2009.

Dystopia
Dystopia was released in October 2011 - 12 tracks featuring the previously released Scavenger.  This was promoted via numerous UK live dates in autumn 2011 with supporting acts including Pythia.

Sojourn
Sojourn was released in November 2013 - A three disc set, 1 DVD 2 CD.  The DVD featuring Live at M'Era Luna August 2012 and Live at Metal Voices Fest (2012), a CD of the same shows and a CD of collaborations.  The album was launched with a small UK tour with shows in Cambridge, London and Sheffield.

Members

Current line-up
 Lahannya - songwriting / vocalist
 Lutz Demmler - songwriting / bass
 Christopher Milden - guitar
 Luca Mazzucconi - drums

Discography

Albums
 2007: Shotgun Reality
 2009: Defiance
 2011: Dystopia

EPs
 2000: Drowning EP
 2008: Welcome to the Underground EP

Live albums
 2013: Sojourn

Singles
 2007: "Bleed for Me"

Compilation albums
 1998: Amduscias - Various Artists (Zenflesh Records); contributed the track 'Drowning' to this compilation

Collaborations
 2003: Another Life - Greenhaus (Future Recordings); co-songwriter and vocalist on over half of the tracks on the album
 2004: Revenge - Soman (Out of Line Music); co-songwritier and vocalist for the track Tears feat. Lahannya
 2004: Machineries of Joy - Various Artists (Out of Line Music); co-songwriter and vocalist for the track Antique by Soman
 2004: Sex, Drogen Und Industrial - Combichrist (Out of Line Music); spoken sample for the Soman remix of the title track Sex, Drugs & Industrial
 2005: [psi] (2 cd version) - Xotox (Pronoize); spoken intro for the included video of the track [psi]
 2006: Harmonia Mundi - Various Artists (Danse Macabre); co-songwriter and vocalist for the track My Angel by Wintry
 2006: Like an Animal - Dracul (Spirit Production); co-songwriter and vocalist for the tracks Vampiria's Dream and Deathwish
 2007: Mask - Soman (Infacted); co-songwriter and vocalist for the tracks Mask and Eye to Eye
 2007: Nie Mehr - ASP (Trisol); remix of the title track Nie Mehr
 2008: In Den Zehn Morgen - Xotox (Pronoize); vocalist for the track Habitat
 2010 : Noistyle - Soman  Skin Deep feat. Lahannya

References

External links 
 Official site
 Official Myspace
 Girlband Profile

English women singers
English heavy metal musical groups
English rock music groups
British electronic music groups
Living people
Year of birth missing (living people)